This is a summary of 1924 in music in the United Kingdom.

Events
13 May – Edward Elgar is appointed Master of the King's Musick in succession to Sir Walter Parratt.
date unknown
Richard Runciman Terry resigns as organist of Westminster Cathedral because of criticism of his choice of music, "erratic behaviour" and "neglect of duty".
The London Labour Choral Union is launched by Rutland Boughton.

Popular music
"The Bristol Pageant", w. Frederic Weatherly, m. Hubert Hunt 
"There's Life In The Old Girl Yet" w.m. Noël Coward
"Will You Forgive?", m. Albert Ketèlbey

Classical music: new works
Gustav Holst – Choral Symphony (premiered in 1925)
William Walton – Bucolic Comedies (lost), with words by Edith Sitwell
Arthur Wood – My Native Heath (orchestral suite, including the maypole dance "Barwick Green", now famous as the theme to The Archers)

Opera
Ralph Vaughan Williams – Hugh the Drover, with libretto by Harold Child

Musical theatrePrimrose, written for the London stage by Guy Bolton and George Grossmith Jr., with lyrics by Desmond Carter and Ira Gershwin, and music by George Gershwin.Puppets, revue with music by Ivor Novello and others, starring Binnie Hale & Stanley Lupino

Births
8 January – Ron Moody, star of Oliver! (died 2015)
21 January – Benny Hill, comedian, actor and singer (died 1992)
9 February – George Guest, organist and choirmaster of St John's College, Cambridge (died 2002)
27 February – Trevor Duncan, composer (died 2005)
8 March – Alan Dell, BBC radio DJ (died 1995)
15 April – Sir Neville Marriner, conductor and violinist (died 2016)
18 April – Buxton Orr, composer (died 1997)
6 May – Denny Wright, jazz guitarist (died 1992)
19 May – Sandy Wilson, composer of The Boyfriend'' (died 2014)
1 June – John Tooley, opera director and manager (died 2020)
19 September – Ernest Tomlinson, light music composer (died 2015)

Deaths
2 January – Sabine Baring-Gould, hymn-writer and collector of folk songs, 89
15 February – Lionel Monckton, composer, 62
18 March – Frederick Bridge, organist and composer, 79
27 March – Sir Walter Parratt, composer, Master of the King's Musick, 83
29 March – Sir Charles Villiers Stanford, composer, 71
5 April – Rosalind Ellicott, composer, 66 
23 June – Cecil Sharp, folk song and dance revivalist, 64
6 August – John Roberts (Pencerdd Gwynedd), organist and composer, 76
26 November – Rose Hersee, operatic soprano, 78

See also
 1924 in the United Kingdom
 List of British films of 1924

References

British Music, 1924 in
Music
British music by year
1920s in British music